Nephus ornatus, the ornate lady beetle, is a species of dusky lady beetle in the family Coccinellidae. It is found in North America.

Subspecies
 Nephus ornatus naviculatus (Casey, 1899)
 Nephus ornatus ornatus (LeConte, 1850)

References

Further reading

 
 
 
 
 

Coccinellidae
Beetles described in 1850